Signe was a legendary Finnish princess mentioned in Gesta Danorum. The realm of her father, Sumble was invaded by the Danish king, Gram of Denmark, but after noticing her, Gram halted the invasion and proposed to her. Before the marriage could be arranged, Gram had to go to Sweden, while he was away her father plotted to marry her off to a Saxon king, Henry. Signe, unhappy with his arrangement, informed Gram, causing Gram to murder Henry during their wedding.

The text

References

Legendary Danish people
Fictional Finnish people